is a railway station located in the city of  Tsuruoka, Yamagata Prefecture, Japan, operated by the  East Japan Railway Company (JR East).

Lines
Uzen-Mizusawa Station is served by the Uetsu Main Line, and is located  rail kilometers from the terminus of the line at Niitsu Station.

Station layout
The station has one side platform and one island platform connected to the station building by a footbridge. The station is unattended.

Platforms

History
Uzen-Mizusawa Station was opened on September 5, 1926. With the privatization of the JNR on April 1, 1987, the station came under the control of the East Japan Railway Company. A new station building was completed in October 2013.

Surrounding area

See also
List of railway stations in Japan

External links

 JR East Station information 

Stations of East Japan Railway Company
Railway stations in Yamagata Prefecture
Uetsu Main Line
Railway stations in Japan opened in 1926
Tsuruoka, Yamagata